The 2005–06 network television schedule for the six major English language commercial broadcast networks in the United States. The schedule covers primetime hours from September 2005 through August 2006. The schedule is followed by a list per network of returning series, new series, and series cancelled after the 2004–05 season.

This would be the final season of broadcasting for both UPN and The WB. They would merge to form The CW next season. The famous Monday Night Football would move to ESPN from ABC after the 2005 NFL season ended with Super Bowl XL.

PBS is not included, as member television stations have local flexibility over most of their schedules and broadcast times for network shows may vary.

New series are highlighted in bold.

All times are U.S. Eastern and Pacific Time (except for some live sports or events). Subtract for one hour for Central, Mountain, Alaska and Hawaii-Aleutian times.

From February 10 to 26, 2006, all of NBC's primetime programming was preempted in favor of coverage of the 2006 Winter Olympics in Turin.

Each of the 30 highest-rated shows is listed with its rank and rating as determined by Nielsen Media Research.

Legend

Sunday

Note: On September 17, 2006, The WB aired The Night of Favorites and Farewells starting at 5:00 p.m. ET. The special included the pilot episodes of Felicity, Angel, Buffy the Vampire Slayer, and Dawson's Creek. The special served as the network's last nationally scheduled broadcast.

Monday 

Note: Emily's Reasons Why Not and Jake in Progress premiered on ABC on January 9, 2006 at 8:00 and 8:30 p.m. respectively, and were removed from the schedule after airing one episode.
Note: One Ocean View premiered on ABC on July 31, 2006 at 10 p.m. and was removed from the schedule after airing two episodes.

Tuesday

Note: Get This Party Started premiered on UPN on February 7, 2006 at 9:00 p.m. and was removed from the schedule after airing two episodes.
Note: Tuesday Night Book Club premiered on CBS on June 13, 2006 at 10:00 p.m. and was removed from the schedule after airing two episodes.

Wednesday

Thursday

Friday

Note: Inconceivable premiered on NBC on September 23, 2005 at 10:00 p.m. and was removed from the schedule after airing two episodes.

Saturday

By network

ABC

Returning series:
20/20
ABC Saturday Movie of the Week
According to Jim
America's Funniest Home Videos
Alias
The Bachelor
Boston Legal
Dancing with the Stars
Desperate Housewives
Extreme Makeover: Home Edition
George Lopez
Grey's Anatomy
Hope & Faith
Jake in Progress
Less than Perfect
Lost
Monday Night Football
Primetime
Rodney
Supernanny
Wife Swap
The Wonderful World of Disney

New series:
American Inventor
Commander in Chief
Crumbs
Emily's Reasons Why Not
The Evidence
Freddie
Hot Properties
How to Get the Guy
In Justice
Invasion
Master of Champions
Miracle Workers
Night Stalker
The One: Making a Music Star
One Ocean View
Sons & Daughters
What About Brian

Not returning from 2004–05:
8 Simple Rules
The Bachelorette (revived and returned for 2007–08)
The Benefactor
Blind Justice
Complete Savages
Extreme Makeover
Eyes
Life as We Know It
Life of Luxury
My Wife and Kids
NYPD Blue

CBS

Returning series:
48 Hours
60 Minutes
The Amazing Race
Big Brother
CBS Sunday Movie
Cold Case
CSI: Crime Scene Investigation
CSI: Miami
CSI: NY
The King of Queens
NCIS
Numbers
Still Standing
Survivor
Two and a Half Men
Without a Trace
Yes, Dear

New series:
Close to Home
Courting Alex
Criminal Minds
Gameshow Marathon
Ghost Whisperer
How I Met Your Mother
Love Monkey
The New Adventures of Old Christine
Out of Practice
Threshold
Tuesday Night Book Club
The Unit

Not returning from 2004–05:
Center of the Universe
Clubhouse
Dr. Vegas
Everybody Loves Raymond
JAG
Joan of Arcadia
Judging Amy
Listen Up!
Wickedly Perfect
The Will

Fox

Returning series:
America's Most Wanted
American Dad!
American Idol
Arrested Development
The Bernie Mac Show
COPS
Family Guy
Hell's Kitchen
House
King of the Hill
Malcolm in the Middle
MLB on Fox
Nanny 911
The O.C.
The Simpsons
So You Think You Can Dance
Stacked
That '70s Show
Trading Spouses

New series:
Bones
Free Ride
Killer Instinct
Kitchen Confidential
The Loop
The OT
Prison Break
Reunion
Skating with Celebrities
Unan1mous
The War at Home

Not returning from 2004–05:
Jonny Zero
Life on a Stick
Method & Red
My Big Fat Obnoxious Boss
North Shore
Point Pleasant
Quintuplets
The Rebel Billionaire: Branson's Quest for the Best
Renovate My Family
The Simple Life
The Sketch Show
Totally Outrageous Behavior
Tru Calling (revived by Syfy in 2008)
Who's Your Daddy?
World's Craziest Videos

NBC

Returning series:
The Apprentice
The Biggest Loser
The Contender
Crossing Jordan
Dateline NBC
ER
Fear Factor
Joey
Las Vegas
Last Comic Standing
Law & Order
Law & Order: Special Victims Unit
Law & Order: Criminal Intent
Law & Order: Trial by Jury
Medium
Most Outrageous Moments
The Office
Scrubs
The West Wing
Will & Grace

New series:
America's Got Talent
The Apprentice: Martha Stewart
The Book of Daniel
Celebrity Cooking Showdown
Conviction
Deal or No Deal
E-Ring
Four Kings
Heist
Inconceivable
My Name Is Earl
Surface
Teachers
Three Wishes
Treasure Hunters
Windfall

Not returning from 2004–05:
American Dreams
Committed
Father of the Pride
Hawaii
LAX
Medical Investigation
Revelations
Third Watch

UPN

Returning series:
All of Us
America's Next Top Model
Cuts
Eve
Girlfriends
Half & Half
One on One
UPN's Night at the Movies
Veronica Mars
WWE SmackDown

New series:
Everybody Hates Chris
Get This Party Started
Love, Inc.
Sex, Love & Secrets
South Beach

Not returning from 2004–05:
The Bad Girl's Guide
Britney and Kevin: Chaotic
Kevin Hill
The Road to Stardom with Missy Elliott
R U the Girl with T-Boz & Chilli
Second Time Around
Star Trek: Enterprise

The WB

Returning series:
7th Heaven
Beauty and the Geek
Blue Collar TV
Charmed
Everwood
Gilmore Girls
Living With Fran
One Tree Hill
Reba
Smallville
What I Like About You

New series:
The Bedford Diaries
Just Legal
Misconceptions
Modern Men
Pepper Dennis
Related
Supernatural
Survival of the Richest
Twins

Not returning from 2004–05:
Big Man on Campus
Commando Nanny
Drew Carey's Green Screen Show
Grounded for Life
High School Reunion
Jack & Bobby
The Mountain
The Starlet
Steve Harvey's Big Time
Summerland

Renewals and cancellations

Renewals

ABC
Boston Legal —Renewed for a third season on May 3, 2006.
Dancing with the Stars—Renewed for a third and fourth seasons.
Desperate Housewives—Renewed for a third season.
Extreme Makeover: Home Edition—Renewed for a fourth season.
Grey's Anatomy—Renewed for a third season.
Lost—Renewed for a third season.

CBS
Close to Home—Renewed for a second season.
Criminal Minds—Renewed for a second season.
CSI: Crime Scene Investigation—Renewed for a seventh season.
CSI: Miami—Renewed for a fifth season.
CSI: NY—Renewed for a third season.
Ghost Whisperer—Renewed for a second season.
How I Met Your Mother—Renewed for a second season.
NCIS—Renewed for a fourth season.
The New Adventures of Old Christine—Renewed for a second season.
Numb3rs—Renewed for a third season.
Two and a Half Men—Renewed for a fourth season.

Fox
American Dad!—Renewed for a second season.
Bones—Renewed for a second season.
Family Guy—Renewed for fifth season.
Futurama—Renewed for an eighth season.
House—Renewed for a third season.
Prison Break—Renewed for a second season.
The Simpsons—Renewed for an eighteenth season.
The War at Home—Renewed for a second season.

NBC
The Biggest Loser—Renewed for a third season.
ER—Renewed for a thirteenth season.
Law & Order: Criminal Intent—Renewed for a sixth season.
Law & Order: Special Victims Unit—Renewed for an eighth season.
My Name Is Earl—Renewed for a second season.
Law & Order—Renewed for a seventeenth season.
The Office—Renewed for a third season.

UPN
America's Next Top Model—Renewed for a seventh and eighth seasons and moving to The CW.

The WB
7th Heaven—Renewed for an eleventh season and moving to The CW.
Gilmore Girls—Renewed for a seventh season and moving to The CW.
One Tree Hill—Renewed for a fourth season and moving to The CW.
Smallville—Renewed for a sixth season and moving to The CW.
Supernatural—Renewed for a second season and moving to The CW.

Cancellations and series endings

ABC
Alias—On November 23, 2005, it was announced that the series would conclude in May 2006.
Commander in Chief
Crumbs
Emily's Reasons Why Not
The Evidence
Freddie
Hope & Faith
Hot Properties
How to Get the Guy
In Justice
Invasion
Jake in Progress
Less than Perfect
Master of Champions
Miracle Workers
Night Stalker
The One: Making a Music Star
One Ocean View
Rodney
Sons & Daughters

CBS
Courting Alex
CBS Sunday Movie—Cancelled on May 17, 2006.
Gameshow Marathon
Love Monkey
Out of Practice
Still Standing
Threshold
Tuesday Night Book Club
Yes, Dear

Fox
Arrested Development—In March 2006, it was revealed the series was cancelled. The series was later revived in 2013 on Netflix.
The Bernie Mac Show
Free Ride
Head Cases
Killer Instinct
Kitchen Confidential
Malcolm in the Middle
Reunion—On November 29, 2005, it was announced Fox was not ordering any additional episodes, essentially cancelling it.
Skating with Celebrities
Stacked
That '70s Show—It was announced on January 17, 2006, that the eighth season would be the last.
Unan1mous

NBC
The Book of Daniel
Celebrity Cooking Showdown
Conviction
E-Ring
Fear Factor—Cancelled in May 2006. It was later revived in 2011.
Four Kings
Heist
Inconceivable
Joey
Surface
Teachers
Thick & Thin
Three Wishes
Treasure Hunters
The West Wing
Will & Grace—Revived in January 2017.
Windfall

UPN
Cuts
Eve
Get This Party Started
Half & Half
Love, Inc.
One on One
Sex, Love & Secrets
South Beach

The WB
The Bedford Diaries
Blue Collar TV
Charmed
Everwood
Just Legal
Living with Fran
Misconceptions
Modern Men
Pepper Dennis
Related
Survival of the Richest
Twins
What I Like About You

References

United States primetime network television schedules
United States Network Television Schedule, 2005-06
United States Network Television Schedule, 2005-06